Ericameria linearifolia is a flowering plant in the family Asteraceae known by the common names narrowleaf goldenbush and interior goldenbush. It is native to California, Nevada, southwestern Utah, and Arizona.

One plant can produce several yellow flower heads, each at the end of a long leafless and unbranched stem. Each head contains up to 18 ray florets and as many as 60 disc florets. It grows in dry creek beds, deserts, mesas, and mountainsides with rocky or sandy soil.

References

External links
Jepson Manual Treatment
United States Department of Agriculture Plants Profile
Calphotos Photo gallery, University of California

linearifolia
Flora of California
Flora of Baja California
Flora of the Southwestern United States
Flora of the California desert regions
Natural history of the California chaparral and woodlands
Natural history of the California Coast Ranges
Natural history of the Mojave Desert
Natural history of the Peninsular Ranges
Natural history of the Transverse Ranges
Plants described in 1836
Taxa named by Augustin Pyramus de Candolle
Flora without expected TNC conservation status